Mirabad-e Ansari (also Romanized as Mīrābād-e Anşārī; also known as Mīrābād) is a village in Fahraj Rural District, in the Central District of Fahraj County, Kerman Province, Iran. At the 2006 census, its population was 643, in 149 families.

References 

Populated places in Fahraj County